Zalesie  is a village in the administrative district of Gmina Police, within Police County, West Pomeranian Voivodeship, in north-western Poland, close to the German border. 

The village has a population of 30.

References

Zalesie